This is a list of electoral results for the Electoral district of Wendouree in Victorian state elections.

Members for Wendouree

Election results

Elections in the 2020s

Elections in the 2010s

References

Victoria (Australia) state electoral results by district